"Trojan Horse" is the fifth single by the Dutch girl group Luv', released in autumn 1978 by Philips/Phonogram Records. This million-seller appears on some editions of the group's debut album, With Luv' (1978), and was a successful hit record in a large part of continental Europe, Israel, South Africa, Zimbabwe, Argentina and New Zealand. It was a minor hit in Australia and Canada. 

The single was remixed in 2006, 2015 and 2022.

Background
This song is the follow-up single to "You're the Greatest Lover" and uses a bagpipe theme. The intro of this track was inspired by the famous "20th-Century Fox Fanfare" by Alfred Newman that accompanies the 20th Century Fox studio logo at the beginning of its productions. Thanks to this hit record, Luv' established itself as one of the most popular Dutch pop acts of the late 1970s.

"Trojan Horse" was included in some editions of the With Luv' album and on CD compilations such as Luv' Gold and 25 Jaar Na Waldolala.

It was used for the soundtrack of the movie Spetters, directed by Paul Verhoeven. In 1979, Luv' played a cameo role in the German movie Cola, Candy, Chocolate in which they performed "Trojan Horse".

Commercial performance

Trojan Horse was a No. 1 hit single in the Netherlands and Flanders (Belgium). It reached the top 5 in Denmark, Austria, Switzerland and Germany, the top 10 in New Zealand and Argentina (where Luv' became a one-hit wonder), the top 20 in Israel, South Africa, Zimbabwe and Finland, the top 50 in France and Australia as well as the top 100 in Canada.

According to a special issue of Billboard magazine about the German recording industry published on December 8, 1979, the single sold 480.000 copies in the Federal Republic of Germany. It also sold 80.000 copies in France, 50.000 copies in Austria (where it turned gold), 100.000 copies in Belgium (gold certification) and 200.000 copies in the Netherlands (platinum certification). In total, more than one million units of the record were sold worldwide.

Track listing and release
Philips/Phonogram licensed the rights for Luv's records to various labels around the world.

7" Vinyl

 a. "Trojan Horse"
 b. "Life Is On My Side"

Cover versions

 The German cover band Super Hit Power performed a version of Trojan Horse in 1978. 
 In 1979, the Dutch band, De Bumpers, performed a parody entitled "M'n Doedelzak".
 In 1979, the Swedish female singer, Siw Inger, sang a German version of the song as "Komm und spiel mit mir". She also covered it in Swedish as "Superman," with different lyrics from the German cover.
 In 1979, Orchester Tony Anderson from Germany recorded a version of the song.
 Singer Glenys Lynne covered the song into Afrikaans under the name "Tsitsikamawoud" in 1979.
 The German cover band, Orchester Tony Anderson, recorded the track for a compilation album "Super Hits '79".
 Disco Light Orchestra from Germany performed an instrumental version for their LP "Disco Sensation" in 1979.
 The German formation, The Golden Akkordeon Harmonists, covered the song for their album "Schlager Hits Akkordeon" in 1979.
 An East German sister duo, Die Molly Sisters, sang a Schlager version of this composition entitled "Im grünen Wald" in 1979.
 King's Group And Singers from the UK recorded their cover of Trojan Horse in 1979. 
 German cover band The Hiltonaires recorded a version of Trojan Horse in 1979. 
 Romanian group 5T recorded a cover version entitled "Calul Troian" in 1979.
 The Czech girl group, Bezinky, covered the song (entitled "Trojský Kůň") in their language in 1980.
 Juraj Lehotský from Czechoslovakia covered it in 1981.
 In 2001, Estonian group Trobikond, a singing group composed of DJs from the radio station "Raadio Elmar," covered the song in their language as "Üks päev". This version has new lyrics entitling how everybody has just one day that's their birthday, and has become a well-known birthday song in Estonia.
 A short-lived German girl group, Luv' Connection, covered the track in 2003.
 Kamelie from the Czech Republic performed the song as "Trojský Kůň," with different lyrics from Bezinky's cover, in the 2000s. 
 Jump With Me, a song by the Dutch jumpstyle band, the Sheffield Jumpers, featured a re-sung chorus from "Trojan Horse" and was released in August 2008. This version peaked at #69 on the German Media Control Charts. 
 In 2009, the entertainer Marco de Hollander sang the song in Dutch and translated it as "Hij speelde elke avond op zijn doedelzak".
 In 2010, the Dutch rock and party band Kiek Now Us rendered it as "Hemel Zonder Bier" in 2010 and reissued it in 2014.
 In 2011, the German-Bosnian act, Engel & Engel, performed it as "So ist die Liebe, mi Amor".
 In 2018, Gáspár Enikő from Hungary covered Trojan Horse in her native language.

Charts and certifications

Weekly charts

Year-end charts

2006 remix

In 2006, Universal Music put out the Completely In Luv' box set including the remastered version of four studio albums: With Luv' (1978), Lots of Luv' (1979), True Luv' (1979) and Forever Yours (1980) on CD.  It featured a 2006 remix of Trojan Horse by J.R Beltman and F.M Endenburg. 

In 2012, Cloud 9 Music released the compilation entitled "The Best of LUV" which was only available on digital platforms. It included an Extended Mix of Trojan Horse 2006 that was previously unreleased.

2015 remix

In 2015, Peter Boonstra published the biography The Story Of Luv' (including exclusive pictures of the girl group). DJ/remixer/producer Matt Pop remixed two tracks: "Trojan Horse" and "Life Is On My Side" for the CD compilation included in the book. The Story Of Luv was eventually banned due to copyright issues on some photographs.

2022 remix

On February 11, 2022, Cloud 9 Music released Trojan Horse (Kav Verhouzer Remix) as a digital single. Two days later, this remix entered the Dutch iTunes Top 100 at #10. One week later, it dropped out of this chart.

Track listing

Digital download/streaming 
 "Trojan Horse (Kav Verhouzer Remix)" – 2:27
 "Trojan Horse (Club Mix by Jaz von D) - 2:50

References

1978 singles
1978 songs
Carrere Records singles
Dutch Top 40 number-one singles
Mega Top 50 number-one singles
Luv' songs
Mercury Records singles
Number-one singles in Belgium
Philips Records singles
Phonogram Records singles
Polydor Records singles
Songs written by Hans van Hemert
Songs written by Piet Souer